Coptic binding or Coptic sewing comprises methods of bookbinding employed by early Christians in Egypt, the Copts, and used from as early as the 2nd century AD to the 11th century. The term is also used to describe modern bindings sewn in the same style.

Coptic bindings, the first true codices, are characterized by one or more sections of parchment, papyrus, or paper sewn through their folds, and (if more than one section) attached to each other with chain stitch linkings across the spine, rather than to the thongs or cords running across the spine that characterise European bindings from the 8th century onwards.  In practice, the phrase "Coptic binding" usually refers to multi-section bindings,  while single-section Coptic codices are often referred to as "Nag Hammadi bindings", after the 13 codices found in 1945 which exemplify the form.

Nag Hammadi bindings 
Nag Hammadi bindings were constructed with a textblock of papyrus sheets, assembled into a single section and trimmed along the fore edge after folding to prevent the inner sheets from extending outward beyond the outer sheets.  Because the inner sheets were narrower than the outer sheets after trimming, the width of text varied through the textblock, and it is likely that the papyrus was not written on until after it was bound; this, in turn, would have made it a necessity to calculate the number of sheets needed for a manuscript before it was written and bound.  Covers of Nag Hammadi bindings were limp leather, stiffened with waste sheets of papyrus.  The textblocks were sewn with tackets, with leather stays along the inside fold as reinforcement.  These tackets also secured the textblock to the covers; on some of the Nag Hammadi bindings, the tackets extended to the outside of the covering leather, while on others the tackets were attached to a strip of leather which served as a spine liner, and which was in turn pasted to the covers.  A flap, either triangular or rectangular, extended from the front cover of the book, and was wrapped around the fore edge of the book when closed.  Attached to the flap was a long leather thong which was wrapped around the book two or three times, and which served as a clasp to keep the book securely shut.

Multi-section Coptic bindings 

Multi-section Coptic bindings had cover boards that were initially composed of layers of papyrus, though by the 4th century, wooden boards were also frequent.  Leather covering was also common by the 4th century, and all subsequent Western decorated leather bindings descend from Coptic bindings.

Approximately 120 original and complete Coptic bindings survive in the collections of museums and libraries, though the remnants of as many as 500 Coptic bindings survive.

The few very early European bindings to survive use the Coptic sewing technique, notably the St Cuthbert Gospel in the British Library (c. 698) and the Cadmug Gospels at Fulda (c. 750)

Modern Coptic bindings 
Modern Coptic bindings can be made with or without covering leather; if left uncovered, a Coptic binding is able to open 360°. If the leather is omitted, a Coptic binding is non-adhesive, and does not require any glue in its construction.

Artisans and crafters often use coptic binding when creating hand made art journals or other books.

See also
Ethiopian binding

Notes

References

External links 
 
 The Signature Optimizer, a JavaScript program to optimize a printed codex for Coptic binding
Build a sturdy notebook with Coptic bookbinding, Makezine.com

Bookbinding
Coptic culture